Jahangir Seyyed Abbasi (born in Urmia, West Azerbaijan) is a former volleyball player from Iran for Shahrdari Urmia VC in Iranian Volleyball Super League, he is coach of Shahrdari Urmia in Iranian Volleyball Super League. and expert volleyball from Iran.

Jahangir Seyyed Abbasi and his brother Vahid Seyyed Abbasi are the uncles of Saeid Marouf.

Awards and honours
Shahrdari Urmia VC Head coach in Iranian Volleyball Super League 
 Runners-Up (1): 2014–15
 Third Place (2): 2008–09, 2015-2016

References

Living people
Iranian men's volleyball players
People from Urmia
Iranian volleyball coaches
Year of birth missing (living people)